Eric Von Schmidt (May 28, 1931 – February 2, 2007) was an American singer and guitarist, songwriter, painter and illustrator, and Grammy Award recipient. He was associated with the folk boom of the late 1950s and early 1960s and a key part of the Cambridge folk music scene. As a singer and guitarist, he was considered to be the leading  specialist in country blues in Cambridge at the time, the  counterpart of Greenwich Village's Dave Van Ronk. Von Schmidt co-authored with Jim Rooney Baby, Let Me Follow You Down: The Illustrated Story of the Cambridge Folk Years.

Biography
Von Schmidt's father, Harold von Schmidt, was a Western painter who did illustrations for the Saturday Evening Post. Von Schmidt began selling his own artwork while he was still a teenager. Following a stint in the army, he won a Fulbright scholarship to study art in Florence. He moved to Cambridge, Massachusetts, in 1957, where he painted and became part of the coffeehouse scene.

Von Schmidt shared his large repertory of traditional music, passing them along to new performers who were developing a more modern version of folk music. He influenced Tom Rush, with whom he revived and arranged the traditional song "Wasn’t That a Mighty Storm?" about the 1900 hurricane that destroyed Galveston, Texas. When he met Bob Dylan, the two traded harmonica licks, drank red wine and played croquet.  Dylan eagerly absorbed von Schmidt's voluminous knowledge of music, including folk, country and the blues. "I sang [Dylan] a bunch of songs, and, with that spongelike mind of his, he remembered almost all of them when he got back to New York," von Schmidt said in The Boston Globe.

Von Schmidt is widely (and erroneously) credited as the author of the song, "Baby, Let Me Follow You Down", which was for years a staple of Dylan's musical catalogue. In a spoken introduction to the song on his 1962 self-titled debut album, Dylan jokingly mentioned that he first "heard" the song from "Rick von Schmidt" and told of meeting him "in the green pastures of Harvard University."  In fact, von Schmidt had adapted the song from Blind Boy Fuller and credited Reverend Gary Davis as author of "three-quarters" of the song. His 1979 book about the Cambridge scene is titled after the song.

Among his best known and performed original compositions is the song "Joshua Gone Barbados" which depicts Ebenezer Joshua the head of labor union and head of the government of Saint Vincent (island) vacationing during a time of labor strife leading indirectly to the deaths of three men.  The accuracy of Von Schmidt's characterization of Joshua's involvement in the incident has been disputed.  Given that Mr. Joshua died poor and remains a revered figure on the island, his depiction in the song is probably less sympathetic than it should be. Nonetheless, the song remains a powerful evocation of the plight of the poor people of Saint Vincent.

In 1963, von Schmidt and Richard Fariña recorded in London's Dobell's Jazz Record store, with Dylan on harmonica. Two years later, The Folk Blues of Eric von Schmidt appeared atop a pile of records on the cover of Dylan's album Bringing It All Back Home.

In May 1964, Dylan visited Von Schmidt at his home in Sarasota, Florida and recorded several songs there, including an early version of "Mr. Tambourine Man". The recordings were released in 2014 as part of Dylan's "50th Anniversary Collection 1964".

In the liner notes for Von Schmidt's 1969 Smash album, Who Knocked The Brains Out Of The Sky? (SRS 67124), notes which also appeared on a cover sticker for Von Schmidt's 1972 Poppy album 2nd Right 3rd Row, Dylan wrote: 
Of course we had heard about Eric Von Schmidt for many years. The name itself had become a password. Eventually, after standing in line to meet him, there it was – his doorstep, a rainy day, and he greeted his visitors, inviting them in. He was told how much they liked Grizzly Bear [a von Schmidt song] and he then invited the whole bunch to the club, where he was about to perform the thing live. "C'mon down to the club" he said – "I'm about to perform it live." We accepted the invitation. And that is what his record is. An invitation. An invitation to the glad, mad, sad, biting, exciting, frightening, crabby, happy, enlightening, hugging, chugging world of Eric Von Schmidt. For here is a man who can sing the bird off the wire and the rubber off the tire. He can separate the men from the boys and the note from the noise. The bridle from the saddle and the cow from the cattle. He can play the tune of the moon. The why of the sky and the commotion from the ocean. Yes he can.

Artist
Von Schmidt had a parallel career as a painter, and created album covers for Baez, Cisco Houston, John Renbourn, Reverend Gary Davis, the Blue Velvet Band, Jackie Washington Landron and for James Baldwin's readings. He also created the cover for The Blues Project compendium of white blues performers (Elektra EKL-264, 1964).  Von Schmidt illustrated a 1973 book of twenty-five ghost stories called The Haunting of America, by Jean Anderson.  In the final 30 years of his life, Von Schmidt recorded only two records, and instead focused on his art career.

Four years before his death, von Schmidt painted his last epic of American history. The canvas' subject was of Lewis and Clark's Corps of Discovery honoring its bicentennial. He also continued work on his "Giants of the Blues" series of paintings.

Von Schmidt also illustrated numerous children's books including a number of collaborations with Sid Fleischman.

Awards and legacy
Von Schmidt was known for an exuberant musical style that he liked to apply to American folk classics.  "Eric's got that wild spirit, and he doesn't water the music down for polite society," Ramblin' Jack Elliott told The Boston Globe in 1996.

Von Schmidt's music has been recorded by Travis MacRae and Jeff Buckley.  In 2000, the same year he was diagnosed with throat cancer, he was honored with the ASCAP Foundation Lifetime Achievement Award at an event fittingly held at Club Passim, his old stomping ground when it was named Club 47. The highlight of the event was a reunion of the Jim Kweskin Jug Band including Maria Muldaur, Geoff Muldaur, Fritz Richmond, and, for the first time in over twenty years, Jim Kweskin.

In 1997, he won a Grammy Award for his work on a compilation album entitled Anthology of American Folk Music, Vol. 1-3.  He painted up until his death, and completed an epic mural of the Battle of the Alamo.

Von Schmidt was twice divorced and had two daughters. He suffered a stroke in August 2006, and died six months later, at the age of 75.

Discography

Albums

Compilations
Come for to Sing, Pathways of Sound, 1963
The Blues Project, Elektra, 1964
Folklore Jamboree, Prestige Records, 1964
The Newport Folk Festival 1965, Vanguard Records, 1965
Take a Trip with Me: Psychedelic Hits", Prestige Records, 197?
Bleecker & McDougal: The Folk Scene of the 60s, Elektra, 1984
Blues in the Bottle, Big Beat Records, 1988
Troubadours of the Folk Era, Vol. 1, Rhino Records, 1992
Blues with a Feeling (Newport Folk Festival Classics), Vanguard, 1993
The Prestige/Folklore Years, Vol. 1, Prestige Records, 1995
The Prestige/Folklore Years, Vol. 2, Prestige Records, 1995
The Acoustic Highway Collection: The Road to Country Rock, EMI, 1996
Blues in the Sun, Vol. 7 (Blues Blue, Blues White): The Bluesville Years, Prestige Records, 1996
Blues with a Feeling, Part Two, Vanguard Records, 1997
Washington Square Memoirs: The Great Urban Folk Boom (1950–1970), Rhino Records, 2001
Evening at Greasy Spoon Diner, P-Vine Records, 2002

References

External links
Obituary, The Guardian, 5 February 2007.
Official Site of Harold and Eric Von Schmidt
The Band website
bobdylanroots.com

The World's Hippest Geezers
Illustrated Eric Von Schmidt discography
Interview with Eric Von Schmidt
Wasn't That A Mighty Storm lyrics
Richard & Mimi Fariña's Home Page
Obituary/New York Times

1931 births
2007 deaths
American blues guitarists
American blues singer-songwriters
American country singer-songwriters
American folk singers
American folk guitarists
American male guitarists
American male singer-songwriters
People from Westport, Connecticut
Grammy Award winners
20th-century American painters
American male painters
21st-century American painters
21st-century American male artists
20th-century American singers
20th-century American guitarists
Prestige Records artists
Transatlantic Records artists
Smash Records artists
20th-century American male singers
Singer-songwriters from Connecticut
20th-century American male artists